Little Joe 5A was an unmanned launch escape system test of the Mercury spacecraft, conducted as part of the U.S. Mercury program. It was an attempted re-test of the failed Little Joe 5 flight. The mission used production Mercury spacecraft #14 atop a Little Joe booster rocket. The mission was launched March 18, 1961, from Wallops Island, Virginia. The LJ-5 failure sequence was repeated when capsule escape rocket again ignited prematurely with the capsule remaining attached to the booster. In this flight however, a ground command was sent to separate the capsule from the booster and escape tower. This allowed the main and reserve parachutes to deploy and the capsule was recovered with only minor damage. It would be used again on the subsequent Little Joe 5B mission, in a third attempt to achieve mission objectives. The mission lasted 5 minutes 25 seconds.

Mercury spacecraft # 14 used in the Little Joe 5A mission, is currently displayed at the Virginia Air and Space Center, Hampton, Virginia.

References

Project Mercury
1961 in spaceflight